Kenny Dennis EP is an EP by American rapper Serengeti. It was released on Anticon on April 3, 2012. Entirely produced by Jel and Odd Nosdam, it was recorded in Berkeley, California.

Critical reception

Matt Sullivan of Impose said: "This is high-caliber parody that avoids cheap laughs by going for deeper, unspoken punchlines." Brett Uddenberg of San Diego Reader called it "well-crafted hilarious escapism."

Spin included it on the "40 Best Hip-Hop Albums of 2012" list.

Track listing

Personnel
Credits adapted from liner notes.

 Serengeti – vocals
 Jel – production
 Odd Nosdam – production
 Bre'r – bass guitar (5)
 Daddy Kev – mastering
 Frohawk Two-Feathers – artwork

References

External links
 

2012 EPs
Serengeti (rapper) EPs
Anticon EPs
Albums produced by Jel (music producer)
Albums produced by Odd Nosdam